John Towers may refer to:

John Towers (bishop) (died 1649), English churchman, Bishop of Peterborough
John Towers (minister) (–1804), English Independent minister
John T. Towers (1809–1855), mayor of Washington, D.C from 1854 to 1856
John Henry Towers (1885–1955), United States Navy admiral and pioneer naval aviator
John Towers (footballer) (1913–1979), English footballer, played for Darlington
John Towers (businessman) (born 1948), English businessman, founder of Phoenix Venture Holdings

Similar spelling
John Tower (1925–1991), U.S. senator from Texas